Li Yundi is a classical pianist born in Chongqing, China on October 7, 1982. He is also popularly known as Yundi Li. His discography contains 6 studio albums. He has also made four contributions to compilation albums not under his name and featured in two video items, a 2004 concert and a documentary.

Li signed an exclusive contract with Deutsche Grammophon in 2001 and in early 2002 he released his first album, containing the works of Chopin. In 2003, the year of Li's Carnegie Hall debut, Deutsche Grammophon released his second album, an all-Liszt CD which was given the title "Best CD of the Year" by The New York Times, which also referred to his 2008 release of Prokofiev's Piano Concerto No. 2 and Ravel's Piano Concerto in G major as one of the best classical CDs of the year. Li continued to record for Deutsche Grammophon until November 2008, releasing a total of 6 albums with the label.

In 2010 he began to record with EMI, with whom he signed an exclusive recording contract to record Chopin’s complete solo piano works. His first EMI release, the complete Nocturnes was released in March 2010.

In May 2012, YUNDI officially signed with Universal Music Group and cooperated with Deutsche Grammophon once again. He then released recordings of Beethoven Piano Sonatas, Beethoven Emperor and Schumann Fantasie, THE ART OF YUNDI, Chopin Prelude and Chopin Ballades Berceuse Mazurkas.

Albums

Video releases (and see above for CD with DVD)

Contributions

References
General

Specific

External links
Yundimusic Official Website
Deutsche Grammophon Official Website
[ Li Yundi] at Allmusic

Discographies of classical pianists